Song of Songs  is an English adaptation of the play  Cantique des Cantiques  written in 1938 by the French dramatist Jean Giraudoux.

Plot summary
The President is at a table of in Parisian cafe waiting for his young lover, Florence.  When she arrives she announces that she is going to marry Jerome, a young man she has just met.

Original productions
Cantique des Cantiques was translated into English by John Raikes, in the Tulane Drama Review (1959), and by Herma Briffault, in Barry Ulanov, Makers of Modern Theatre (1961).

Cantique des Cantiques was first performed on 12 October 1938 in Paris at the Comedie Française in a production by Louis Jouvet.

References

Plays by Jean Giraudoux
1938 plays